Vancouver Waterfront Park is a  waterfront park in Vancouver, Washington, in the United States.

Description and history

The site was originally home to a paper mill owned by Boise Cascade that closed in 2005. In 2006 real estate development company Gramor Development, Inc. owned by Barry Cain, formed a partnership with three local couples (Steve and Jan Oliva, Steve and Jo Marie Hansen and Al and Sandee Kirkwood) to acquire and develop the property. That partnership Columbia Waterfront LLC, acquired the property in February 2008. A master plan from the LLC was approved by the city government the following year. New street connections were built from the north in 2014 and 2015. About the same time Columbia Waterfront LLC donated the 7.3 acre park property to the City of Vancouver.

The  M.J. Murdock Charitable Trust was announced as the first office tenant for the project in 2015. The $1.3 billion project, consisting of a city park and pier and five residential, office and retail buildings, began construction in 2016. The park opened September 29, 2018.

The city installed a pair of Portland Loo public toilets at the park in October 2018.  The loos are especially designed to remain open 24/7. Slats allow a potential user to see if the toilet is already occupied, and if more than one individual is inside. They are large enough that a user can wheel in a child's stroller, shopping buggy, bicycle, or dog.  The bathrooms installed in Vancouver are equipped with both a table for changing babies, and a bin for addicts to safely dispose of used needles.

See also
 Captain George Vancouver Monument Plaza
 Headwaters at Vancouver Waterfront Park
 Vancouver Land Bridge

References

External links
 

2018 establishments in Washington (state)
Geography of Vancouver, Washington
Parks in Washington (state)
Planned developments
Protected areas established in 2018